The Omsk State Regional Research Library, named after Alexander Pushkin, is the oldest public library in Omsk and is the main research library in the region.

History
In 1899 the Omsk Municipal Duma made a decision to open a municipal public library in honour of Alexander Pushkin's centenary. The library was opened in January 1907. It was located in the extension to the Municipal Duma. Two adjoining rooms were set aside for the reading hall and lending facilities. The library initially held 4160 books and magazines and attracted 370 readers in its first year.

In 1920 the library added a study room, a museum, and departments of Russian literature, foreign literature and modern editions, a children's section, a club, and a bindery. During and after the October Revolution the library's collection expanded to over 300,000 items, making it one of the largest libraries in Siberia. From 1922 to 1924 the library shared a building with the central post office. However, by 1924 the library occupied almost the whole building, and it was relocated to its own building.

Since 1940 the library has received copies of all books published in the country.  During the Great Patriotic War all the activity of the Pushkin library was subordinated to the war time needs. The employees had to answer the inquiries of specialists from industrial enterprises, theatres and organizations that were evacuated to Omsk from the European part of the country.

In 1960 the departments of technical, agricultural and musical literature were opened and a culture and art information service was created.  BY 1967, the library held over one million items. 

On April 28, 1995, the library moved to a new building designed by Vasily Trokhimchuk. The library achieved the status of the Central State Library of the Omsk Region.

The architectural and sculptural design
Vasily Trokhimchuk began to work on the architectural and sculptural design of the new building in 1982. Eight 3.5m made of hammered blued copper occupy niches along the principal front, representing outstanding figures of Russia of a thousand years of Russian history.
Yaroslav the Wise founder of the Russian state
Sergius of Radonezh, leader of spiritual renewal in medieval Russia. 
Andrei Rublev, the symbol of Old Russian art
Nikolay Karamzin, historian, romantic writer, poet and critic
Mikhail Lomonosov, polymath, scientist and writer,
Mikhail Glinka,  the first Russian composer to gain wide recognition within his own country 
Konstantin Tsiolkovsky one of the founding fathers of modern rocketry and astronautics. 

At the centre of this sculptural pantheon is the figure of Alexander Pushkin. The statues of Alexander Pushkin and Andrei Rublev were created by the project author V.A. Trokhimchuk.

Visits
In 1923 the Omsk central library was visited by the people's commissar of education A.V. Lunacharsky.
In 2001 the library was visited by the president of Korean Democratic People's Republic Kim Jong-il during his mission to Omsk.

External links
The library's website
The history of the library creation

Omsk
Buildings and structures in Omsk Oblast
Libraries in Russia
Library buildings completed in 1995